An enterprise service bus (ESB) implements a communication system between mutually interacting software applications in a service-oriented architecture (SOA). It represents a software architecture for distributed computing, and is a special variant of the more general client-server model, wherein any application may behave as server or client. ESB promotes agility and flexibility with regard to high-level protocol communication between applications. Its primary use is in enterprise application integration (EAI) of heterogeneous and complex service landscapes.

Architecture
The concept of the enterprise service bus is analogous to the bus concept found in computer hardware architecture combined with the modular and concurrent design of high-performance computer operating systems. The motivation for the development of the architecture was to find a standard, structured, and general purpose concept for describing implementation of loosely coupled software components (called services) that are expected to be independently deployed, running, heterogeneous, and disparate within a network. ESB is also a common implementation pattern for service-oriented architecture, including the intrinsically adopted network design of the World Wide Web.

No global standards exist for enterprise service bus concepts or implementations. Most providers of message-oriented middleware have adopted the enterprise service bus concept as de facto standard for a service-oriented architecture. The implementations of ESB use event-driven and standards-based message-oriented middleware in combination with message queues as technology frameworks. However, some software manufacturers relabel existing middleware and communication solutions as ESB without adopting the crucial aspect of a bus concept.

Functions
An ESB applies the design concept of modern operating systems to independent services running within networks of disparate and independent computers. Like concurrent operating systems, an ESB provides commodity services in addition to adoption, translation and routing of client requests to appropriate answering services.

The primary duties of an ESB are:
 Route messages between services
 Monitor and control routing of message exchange between services
 Resolve contention between communicating service components
 Control deployment and versioning of services
 Marshal use of redundant services
 Provide commodity services like event handling, data transformation and mapping, message and event queuing and sequencing, security or exception handling, protocol conversion and enforcing proper quality of communication service.

History 
The first published usage of the term "enterprise service bus" is attributed to Roy W. Schulte from the Gartner Group 2002 and the book The Enterprise Service Bus by David Chappell. Although a number of companies take credit for coining the phrase, in an interview, Schulte said that the first time he heard the phrase was from a company named Candle and went on to say: "The most direct ancestor to the ESB was Candle’s Roma product from 1998" whose Chief Architect and patent application holder was Gary Aven. Roma was first sold in 1998 making it the first commercial ESB in the market, but that Sonic's product from 2002 was also one of the early ESBs on the market.

 Service - denotes non-iterative and autonomously executing programs that communicate with other services through message exchange
 Bus - is used in analogy to a computer hardware bus
 Enterprise - the concept has been originally invented to reduce complexity of enterprise application integration within an enterprise; the restriction has become obsolete since modern Internet communication is no longer limited to a corporate entity

ESB as software

The ESB is implemented in software that operates between the business applications, and enables communication among them.  Ideally, the ESB should be able to replace all direct contact with the applications on the bus, so that all communication takes place via the ESB.  To achieve this objective, the ESB must encapsulate the functionality offered by its component applications in a meaningful way.  This typically occurs through the use of an enterprise message model. The message model defines a standard set of messages that the ESB transmits and receives. When the ESB receives a message, it routes the message to the appropriate application.  Often, because that application evolved without the same message model, the ESB has to transform the message into a format that the application can interpret. A software adapter fulfills the task of effecting these transformations, analogously to a physical adapter.

ESBs rely on accurately constructing the enterprise message model and properly designing the functionality offered by applications. If the message model does not completely encapsulate the application functionality, then other applications that desire that functionality may have to bypass the bus, and invoke the mismatched applications directly. Doing so violates the principles of the ESB model, and negates many of the advantages of using this architecture.

The beauty of the ESB lies in its platform-agnostic nature and the ability to integrate with anything at any condition. It is important that Application Lifecycle Management vendors truly apply all the ESB capabilities in their integration products while adopting SOA. Therefore, the challenges and opportunities for EAI vendors are to provide an integration solution that is low-cost, easily configurable, intuitive, user-friendly, and open to any tools customers choose.

Characteristics

¹ Some do not regard process choreography as an ESB function. For example, see M.Richards.

² While process choreography supports implementation of complex business processes that require coordination of multiple business services (usually using BPEL), service orchestration enables coordination of multiple implementation services (most suitably exposed as an aggregate service) to serve individual requests.''

These solutions often focus on low-level ESB functions, such as connectivity, routing and transformation, and require coding or scripting to implement orchestration.  Developers operating at a project or tactical level, e.g., just trying to fix a problem, often gravitate toward lightweight service bus technologies, but there is often ongoing tension between these initiatives and an enterprise architecture whose goal it is to optimize infrastructure across multiple projects.

If the message broker, the ESB software, translates a message from one format to another, then as with any translation, there is the issue of semantics of the message. For example, a record can be translated from JSON to XML, but the same set of fields can be interpreted differently by different applications, specifically in the case of the various corner cases that are usually known only to developers that have extensive experience with the application that is connected to the ESB. For the known corner cases the number of tests that cover all corner cases increases exponentially with every application that is connected to the ESB, because every ESB-connected application must be tested against every other application that is connected to the ESB.

Key benefits

 Scales from point-solutions to enterprise-wide deployment (distributed bus)
 More configuration rather than integration coding
 No central rules-engine, no central broker
 Easy plug-in and plug-out and loosely coupling system

Key disadvantages
 Slower communication speed, especially for those already compatible services
 Single point of failure, can bring down all communications in the Enterprise
 High configuration and maintenance complexity

Products

Notable products include:

 Proprietary
Candle's Roma ESB - bought by IBM and became WebSphere ESB 
IBM App Connect, formerly IBM Integration Bus and IBM WebSphere ESB
InterSystems Ensemble
Information Builders iWay Service Manager
Microsoft Azure Service Bus
Microsoft BizTalk Server
Mule  ESB 
Oracle Enterprise Service Bus 
Progress Software Sonic ESB (acquired by Trilogy)
SAP Process Integration
TIBCO Software ActiveMatrix BusinessWorks
webMethods enterprise service bus (acquired by Software AG)
Sonic ESB from Aurea
XIATech Single Data View
Open-source software
Apache Camel
Apache ServiceMix
Apache Synapse
Fuse ESB from Red Hat
JBoss ESB
NetKernel
Open ESB
Petals ESB
Spring Integration
UltraESB
WSO2 ESB

See also

 Enterprise Integration Patterns
 Event-driven messaging
 Java Business Integration
 Business Process Management
 Universal Integration Platform
 Enterprise application integration
 Business Service Provider
 Message Oriented Middleware
 Complex event processing
 Event Stream Processing
 Event-driven programming
 Comparison of Business Integration Software
 Comparison of BPEL engines
 Comparison of BPMN 2.0 Engines
 Composite application
 Event-driven SOA
 Integration Platform as a service (iPaaS)

References

Further reading
 David Chappell, "Enterprise Service Bus" (O’Reilly: June 2004)
 Binildas A. Christudas, "Service-oriented Java Business Integration" (Packt Publishers: February 2008,)
 Michael Bell, "Service-Oriented Modeling: Service Analysis, Design, and Architecture" (2008 Wiley & Sons)

External links
 "Lasting concept or latest buzzword?" (Nicolas Farges, 2003)
 Enterprise service buses hit the road: Infoworld Test Center (July 22, 2005)
 JSR-208: Java Business Integration (August 2005)
 The Role of the Enterprise Service Bus (InfoQ - Video Presentation) (October 23, 2006)
 ESB Roundup Part One: Defining the ESB (InfoQ) (July 13, 2006)
 ESB Roundup Part Two: Use Cases (InfoQ) (July 5, 2006)
 "Services Fabric—Fine Fabrics for New Era Systems" (Binildas A. Christudas, 2007)
 "ESBs in 2007: Taking the Open Source Bus to SOA" (Dennis Byron, September 20, 2007)
 Aggregate Services in ServiceMix JBI ESB: PACKT Publishers (Binildas A. Christudas, November 30, 2007)
 ESB Topology alternatives (InfoQ, A. Louis, May 23, 2008)
 Rethinking the ESB: Building a Simple, Secure, Scalable Service Bus with a SOA Gateway (Computerworld, J. Ryan, 2011)
 
 The Enterprise Service Bus, re-examined (IBM developer Works, Greg Flurry and Kim Clark, May 2011)

Enterprise application integration
Message-oriented middleware
Service-oriented (business computing)
Software architecture